Jhansi Lok Sabha constituency is a Lok Sabha (parliamentary) constituency in south-western Uttar Pradesh state in northern India.

The serial number of this constituency in Uttar Pradesh is 46. This constituency includes geographical boundaries of Lalitpur district also (in due south from Jhansi city).

Assembly Segments

Members of Parliament

Election results

2019 Lok Sabha

2014 Lok Sabha

1977 Lok Sabha

1971 Lok Sabha
 Govind Dass Richharia (INC) : 143,137 votes  
 Sushila Nayar (NCO) : 68,566

See also
 Jhansi district
 List of Constituencies of the Lok Sabha

Notes

References

Lok Sabha constituencies in Uttar Pradesh
Jhansi district